Naveen D. Padil (born 11 November 1969) is an Indian theatre and film actor who has performed in over a thousand plays mostly in Tulu language. Known widely in the circles of Tulu theatre from his acting performances as a "Master of Comedy and Tragedy", he is called "Kusalda Arase" (The King of Comedy). He is known mainly for his portrayal of comical characters. Padil along with Devadas Kapikad and Aravind Bolar formed a famous trio that appeared in Tulu comedy plays during the 1990s and early 2000s.

Career 
Padil got his break in films with the 1993 Malayalam film Vidheyan directed by the Adoor Gopalakrishnan. In the late 2000s, alongside his theatre career, Padil's film career took off as he began appearing in Tulu films primarily. Popular films include Oriyardori Asal (2011), Telikeda Bolli (2012) and Chaali Polilu (2014). He also appeared in a supporting role in the 2011 Kannada film Jarasandha. In 2014, in recognition of his contribution to theatre, he was awarded at the 24th Sandesha Awards in the Arts segment. His performance in the 2016 Tulu film Kudla Cafe won him the Karnataka State Film Award for Best Supporting Actor.

Filmography

Television

Awards

Karnataka State Film Awards
 Best Supporting Actor: Kudla Cafe

 RED FM Tulu Film Awards
 2014: Best Actor in a Comic Role: Oriyardori Asal

Tulu Cinemotsava 2015
 2015: Best Actor in a Comic Role: Telikeda Bolli
 2015: Best Actor (Public Voting): Chaali Polilu

See also
Tulu cinema
Karnataka State Film Award for Best Regional film

References

External links
 
 

1969 births
Living people
People from Dakshina Kannada district
Tulu people
Mangaloreans
Male actors from Karnataka
Male actors in Tulu cinema
Male actors in Kannada cinema
Indian male film actors
21st-century Indian male actors